Deep artery may refer to

 Deep artery of arm
 Deep artery of clitoris
 Deep artery of the penis
 Deep auricular artery
 Deep cervical artery
 Deep plantar artery
 Deep temporal arteries
 Profunda femoris artery, also known as the deep femoral artery